Constance Cox (ca. 1881-1960) was a Canadian schoolteacher of part Tlingit ancestry who lived and taught with the Gitksan First Nation in northwestern British Columbia and served as interpreter for several anthropologists.

Biography
She was born to Thomas and Margaret Hankin in Hazelton, B.C., and was considered, despite her mixed ancestry, the first white child born in that community. She was baptised by William Ridley, Bishop of the Church of England's Caledonia (northern B.C.) diocese. Her father, Thomas Hankin, sponsored a $3,000 (Cdn) potlatch feast to present the infant Constance to the large population of Gitksans who had come to live at Hazelton. Hankin, a former Hudson's Bay Company employee, had founded Hazelton on his English godmother's legacy, built a store there, and also provided founding investments in the cannery communities of Inverness, and Port Essington, B.C. Margaret Hankin was Tlingit on her mother's side, while her father was an HBC employee. Margaret spoke seven different First Nations languages and passed much of this profiency on to Constance. (Later, Margaret remarried, to Captain R. E. Loring, Indian Agent at Hazelton.)

While serving as Hazelton police interpreter in the trial of three Gitksans arrested in a near-battle between settler miners and Gitksans at Hazelton, Constance met a telegraphist named Eddie R. Cox, whom she married.

Starting in the 1920s, she served as interpreter and sometimes informant during some of the anthropologist Marius Barbeau's fieldwork among the Gitksan. (Some of Barbeau's use of her and her mother's ethnographic and historical information in print led to a recriminatory letter from Cox.)  Barbeau eventually began to rely more on the Tsimshian chief William Beynon's services as interpreter in his Gitksan work.

In 1958, Mrs. Cox served as interpreter when the anthropologists Wilson Duff and Michael Kew brokered an agreement with the nearby Gitksan community of Kitwancool (a.k.a. Gitanyow), arranging for some of the village's totem poles to be removed to the Royal British Columbia Museum for preservation. She also served as interpreter in creating the monograph by Duff that resulted.

She eventually moved to North Vancouver, B.C., with her husband when his employer transferred him there.

Sources
 Cox, Constance (1958) Simon Gun-a-Noot: The Authentic Story.  Native Voice (special ed.), pp. 34–37.
 Duff, Wilson (ed.) (1959) Histories, Territories, and Laws of the Kitwancool. (Anthropology in British Columbia Memoir no. 4.) Victoria, B.C.: Royal British Columbia Museum.
 Neylan, Susan (2003) The Heavens Are Changing: Nineteenth-Century Protestant Missions and Tsimshian Christianity.  Montreal: McGill-Queen's University Press.
 Nowry, Laurence (1995) Marius Barbeau, Man of Mana: A Biography. Toronto: NC Press
 Pedelty, Donovan (1997) "Constance Cox."  In Pioneer Legacy: Chronicles of the Lower Skeena River, Volume 1, ed. by Norma V. Bennett, pp. 227–230. Terrace, B.C.: Dr. R. E. M. Lee Hospital Foundation.
 Sterritt, Neil J., Susan Marsden, Robert Galois, Peter R. Grant, and Richard Overstall (1998) Tribal Boundaries in the Nass Watershed.  Vancouver: University of British Columbia Press.

1880s births
1960 deaths
20th-century anthropologists
20th-century First Nations people
20th-century linguists
Anthropological linguists
Canadian schoolteachers
First Nations academics
Interpreters
Linguists from Canada
Tlingit people
Canadian women anthropologists
Women linguists
20th-century translators
20th-century Canadian women
Women educators
First Nations women